The Streptomyces-atpC RNA motif is a conserved RNA structure that was discovered by bioinformatics.
Streptomyces-atpC motif RNAs are found in organisms classified within the genus Streptomyces.

Streptomyces-atpC motif RNAs likely function as cis-regulatory elements, in view of their positions upstream of protein-coding genes, which encode subunits of ATP synthase.  However, it is also possible that they are small RNAs.

References

Non-coding RNA